The Cathance River is a  river in Maine flowing into Merrymeeting Bay.

It rises in Bowdoin at the junction of West Cathance and East Cathance streams and flows south into Topsham.  Turning east and then northeast, it reaches tidewater at the village of Cathance within Topsham and continues northeast into the town of Bowdoinham.  The river turns south again for its final course to Merrymeeting Bay.

See also
 List of rivers of Maine

References

 
 Maine Streamflow Data from the USGS
 Maine Watershed Data From Environmental Protection Agency

Tributaries of the Kennebec River
Rivers of Maine
Rivers of Sagadahoc County, Maine
Topsham, Maine